Larry Lavern Ball (born September 27, 1949) is a retired American football linebacker.

Ball was drafted out of University of Louisville in the 1972 NFL Draft by the Miami Dolphins. He also played for the Tampa Bay Buccaneers and the Detroit Lions. During his National Football League career, he participated in 79 games. Ball is the only player in NFL history to play an entire season for both an undefeated team, the 1972 Miami Dolphins (where he won Super Bowl VII), and a winless team, the 1976 Tampa Bay Buccaneers. (Maulty Moore also played for the 1972 Dolphins and 1976 Buccaneers, but while he was with the Dolphins for the entire 1972 season, he was signed by the '76 Bucs late in the season, playing in only five games, starting only in the final game. A third player who also played for the '72 Dolphins, Doug Swift, was taken by the Buccaneers in the expansion draft, but retired from football to enter medical school and never reported to the team.)

After football, Ball worked as a guidance counselor, department head, and coach for Miami-Dade County Public Schools in Miami, Florida. He retired in 2011 after more than 30 years of service. He is active in the South Florida community, participating in numerous charity events along with his fellow '72 Undefeated Team teammates.

References

External links
NFL.com article on Ball

1949 births
Living people
Sportspeople from Iowa City, Iowa
Players of American football from Iowa
American football linebackers
Louisville Cardinals football players
Miami Dolphins players
Detroit Lions players
Tampa Bay Buccaneers players